WEEC (Hope 100.7 FM) is a religious radio station licensed to Springfield, Ohio, serving the Dayton metropolitan area. Owned by Strong Tower Christian Media, it broadcasts a worship music format. Its transmitter is located along Troy Road in Springfield, while its studios are shared with sister station WFCJ in Xenia, Ohio.

WEEC broadcasts in HD Radio. It carries three subchannels, with HD2 carrying The Rock (Southern gospel music) and HD3 carrying Peace in the Valley (traditional religious music). The HD4 subchannel carries a Christian talk and teaching format that closely mirrors the programming on its sister station, WFCJ.

History

WEEC was formed in March 1961 by Paul Pontus, Dwight Coffelt, and Rev. Glenn Greenwood and first hit the airwaves on December 15 later that same year at first as a commercial station. However, all commercial programming was eliminated just one year later on December 15, 1962.

WEEC began broadcasting in HD Radio in September 2007.

In 2007, WEEC merged with WFCJ under the banner Strong Tower Christian Media. In 2012, it was announced that both stations would consolidate their operations into new facilities in Xenia, Ohio.

In July 2019, WEEC dropped its Christian teaching programs, moving them exclusively to WFCJ (which rebranded as 93.7 The Light). After a 10,007-song marathon, WEEC flipped to contemporary worship music as Hope 100.7. Shortly thereafter, WEEC added its fourth HD subcarrier, which plays most of the teaching programs it had previously carried on the main carrier.

References

External links
 
 Strong Tower Christian Media
 

EEC
EEC
Moody Radio affiliate stations